Patrick W. Browne was an American college football player and coach. He served as the head football coach at Spring Hill College in Mobile, Alabama from 1931 to 1932. Browne attended Spring Hill, where the played football, basketball, and baseball, and was captain of the 1923 Spring Hill Badgers football team as a senior. He then played football at Tulane University under coaches Clark Shaughnessy and Bernie Bierman, captaining the 1927 Tulane Green Wave football team.

Head coaching record

References

Year of birth missing
Year of death missing
American football ends
American football fullbacks
American football tackles
Spring Hill Badgers baseball players
Spring Hill Badgers football coaches
Spring Hill Badgers football players
Spring Hill Badgers men's basketball players
Tulane Green Wave football players